Allegheny Mountain may refer to:

 The Allegheny Mountains range in the eastern United States
 Mountains within the range, including:
Allegheny Mountain (West Virginia-Virginia), or "Alleghany", demarcating much of the border between the two states
Allegheny Mountain (Pennsylvania) in southwestern Pennsylvania
 The Allegheny Front, in Pennsylvania, Maryland, and West Virginia
 The Allegheny Escarpment, which forms the western edge of the Appalacians

See also
Back Allegheny Mountain